The SMU Mustangs  are the athletic teams that represent Southern Methodist University in University Park, Texas, United States. The Mustangs were founded in 1911 and joined the Southwest Conference, competing against Baylor, Rice, Texas, Texas A&M, Arkansas and Oklahoma A&M (which later became Oklahoma State).

The football team has participated in various Bowl Games, from the Dixie Classic in 1924 to the Hawaii Bowl in 2012. Football alumni include Heisman winner Doak Walker, All-American Eric Dickerson, and two-time Super Bowl winner Forrest Gregg.

American Athletic Conference 

The Mustangs participate in the NCAA Division I (FBS for football) as a member of the American Athletic Conference. SMU was the only private school in the conference when it began operation as The American in 2013, but it was joined by Tulane and Tulsa a year later. From 1918 to 1996, the Mustangs were a member of the Southwest Conference, until it formally disbanded. The Mustangs subsequently joined the Western Athletic Conference and in 2005, SMU accepted an invitation to the Western Division of Conference USA.  They accepted an invitation to join the Big East Conference, which split along football lines in 2013, with SMU and the other FBS schools reorganizing as the American Athletic Conference.

Varsity sports

Football

National titles 
In 1935, SMU had a magnificent season: a 12–1–0 record, scoring 288 points while only giving up 39. The Mustangs completely dominated their opponents.  They shut out eight of their 12 regular season opponents, including conference rivals Texas, Rice, Baylor, and Texas A&M. They were one of the most talented teams in school history. The 1935 Mustangs were crowned national champions by Frank Dickinson, one of seven contemporaneous selectors, all math systems, that chose five different national champions that year. Dickinson was a nationally respected economics professor at the University of Illinois.  SMU unusually claims the 1935 national title without qualification, even though they lost the Rose Bowl, as the Dickinson System was the first math system that was national in scope to select national champions.

SMU claims three national championships in football, including 1981, when SMU was one of five teams selected as co-champions by the National Championship Foundation, and 1982, when the team won the Cotton Bowl Classic and was selected as one of two co-champions by Bill Schroeder of the Helms Athletic Foundation as his last ever selection. All told, the Mustangs have played in 17 bowl games, including one appearance in the Rose Bowl, four appearances in the Cotton Bowl Classic, and four straight bowl appearances following the Mustangs' 2009 resurgence in football.

Southwest Conference Championships 

1923
1926
1931
1935
1947
1948
1966
1981
1982
1984 

Notes

Bowl appearances and results 
 

SMU's closest rival in athletics is Texas Christian University (TCU) in Fort Worth, Texas. In football, SMU and TCU compete annually (with the exception of 2006) for the Iron Skillet. In 2005, an unranked SMU beat then 24th ranked TCU for SMU's first win against a ranked team in 19 years (since October 1986). TCU had won the previous seven football games played against SMU.
SMU competes with the United States Naval Academy for the Gansz Trophy. The Gansz Trophy is awarded to the winner of the United States Naval Academy and Southern Methodist University football game. It was created in 2009 through a collaboration between the two athletic departments. The trophy is named for Frank Gansz who played linebacker at the Naval Academy from 1957 through 1959. Gansz later served as the head coach of the Kansas City Chiefs and on the coaching staffs at Navy and SMU.
SMU once competed annually with Rice University in football for the Battle for the Mayor's Cup. SMU now competes annually with the University of North Texas although there is no trophy to commemorate the winner. 
The Doak Walker Award, an annual collegiate award given to the "most outstanding college running back", is named after SMU Heisman Trophy Winner Doak Walker.
On November 11, 2006, redshirt freshman quarterback Justin Willis broke the single season touchdown pass record held by Chuck Hixson (21). Willis threw for three touchdowns in a 37–27 loss to the University of Houston, setting the new single season record at 23. At the end of the season, Willis set the new record at 26. He also broke the SMU single season touchdown record accounting for 29 touchdowns. He was named to the Freshman All-American team at quarterback.
Starting in December 2014, Chad Morris was named the head football coach. Previously he was the offensive coordinator for Clemson University and the University of Tulsa.

The "death penalty"

On February 25, 1987, the Infractions Committee of the NCAA voted unanimously to cancel SMU's entire 1987 football season and all four of SMU's scheduled home games in 1988 in spite of SMU's cooperation and recommended sanctions.  On April 11, 1987, SMU formally canceled the 1988 season, in effect, self-imposing a death penalty for a second football season.

The program was terminated for the 1987 season because the university was making approximately $61,000 in booster payments from 1985 to 1986. It later emerged that a "slush fund" had been used to pay players as early as the mid-1970s, and athletic officials had known about it as early as 1981.

SMU was eligible for this penalty because it had already been placed on probation less than five years prior to these violations – specifically, in 1985, for earlier recruiting violations. Since many players were poor, boosters would pay for rent or other bills for the parents of the athletes, and several key boosters and administration officials felt it would be unethical to cut off payments. When the sanctions were handed down, SMU had only three players – all seniors about to graduate – receiving payments.

Not long afterward, SMU announced that its football team would stay shuttered for the 1988 season as well after school officials received indications that they wouldn't have enough experienced players to field a viable team.  As it turned out, new coach Forrest Gregg was left with an undersized and underweight lineup.  It took the Mustang football program almost a decade to recover from the effects of the scandal, the team not returning to a bowl game until 2009. Since returning from the Death Penalty seasons, SMU has had six non-losing seasons, two of them .500 seasons.

Basketball

In men's basketball, the Mustangs have one Final Four Appearance accompanied by 14 Southwest Conference Championships. In July 2016, SMU hired Tim Jankovich to lead the Mustangs. Tim Jankovich was fired in 2021.

SMU's women's basketball team is coached by Coach Travis Mays. The team has advanced to the postseason 12 times since 1993 and is a rising power.

Soccer

The men's soccer team is a consistent national contender, including a recent trip to the Elite Eight, and time spent as number one in the nation, finishing the season at number two, earning the school's sixth conference title in the sport.

During the 2006 season, the SMU men's soccer program was ranked No. 1 in the nation for four consecutive weeks. The team sat atop the four national polls with a record of 13–0–2 in the Adidas/NSCA poll, SoccerTimes.com poll, Soccer America Magazine poll, and the CollegeSoccerNews.com poll. Concurrently, the SMU women's soccer program cracked the top 25, at No. 22 in the Adidas/NSCA poll and No. 19 in the SoccerTimes.com poll.
 The SMU men's soccer team finished the 2006 regular season ranked No. 2 in the nation. Additionally, SMU won the C-USA title game, beating Kentucky 2–0 in Tulsa. This C-USA championship win is the sixth conference title for SMU since 1997.
The SMU men's soccer team finished the 2010 season with an overall record of 16–2–2. The Mustangs finished the season with a trip to the quarterfinals where they lost to North Carolina in a penalty kick shootout.

Golf
The men's golf team won the 1954 NCAA Championship. In 2015, Bryson DeChambeau won the NCAA individual championship.

They have won nine conference championships:
Southwest Conference (5): 1931, 1953, 1955, 1956, 1988
Western Athletic Conference (2): 2004, 2005 (co-champions)
Conference USA (1): 2006
American Athletic Conference (1): 2014

In 2006, Golf Digest ranked the SMU men's golf program No. 16 in the nation. On May 1, 2007, SMU senior Colt Knost was named the Conference USA golfer of the year. He earned golfer of the week awards five times during his senior year, and can be recognized for shooting a record setting 64 for an amateur golfer. The 2015 team was given a postseason ban after multiple recruiting violations and unethical conduct under coach Josh Gregory. The decision also meant DeChambeau was not able to defend his title.

SMU's men's golf team was named the number 16 golf team in the nation by Golf Digest in 2006, and produced pro golfer Colt Knost.

In 1979 Kyle O'Brien won the AIAW women's national intercollegiate individual golf championship.

Swimming & Diving
SMU men's swimming and diving was founded in 1932 in the former Southwest Conference. The men's and women's teams have acquired 57 conference titles combined, and have a total of 91 NCAA National Championship appearances. Six SMU swimmers/divers have been named NCAA swimmer/diver of the year. The Robson & Lindley Aquatic Center, the swimming and diving team's brand new Olympic sized pool, was built in 2017 to continue the legacy of successful swimming and diving at SMU.

Rowing 
SMU women's rowing achieved a program-best fourth-place finish at the 2018 American Athletic Conference championship under first year head coach Kim Cupini. The first varsity four won the program's first gold medal and the first varsity eight won bronze. At the 2019 championship, the first varsity eight won gold, breaking University of Central Florida's long winning streak in the event. At the 2019 championship, the SMU rowing team placed a program-best second place.

Equestrian 
The Women's Equestrian Team at SMU competed under the United Equestrian Conference (UEC) until 2019 and now compete under Eastern College Athletic Conference (ECAC). The Dallas Equestrian Center (DEC) is the official stables where the team practices and hosts meets.

Discontinued sports
SMU discontinued several sports in 1980; the university's financial position led to budget cuts across the university, and the university's athletic department had become too big to support.

Baseball
Southern Methodist University fielded a varsity baseball team from 1919 until it was discontinued after the 1980 season for financial reasons. The Mustangs won the 1953 SWC baseball title.

Championships

NCAA team championships

SMU has won four NCAA team national championships and eight overall national championships.

Men's (4)
Golf (1): 1954
Indoor Track & Field (1): 1983
Outdoor Track & Field (2): 1983, 1986
see also:
American Athletic Conference NCAA team championships
List of NCAA schools with the most NCAA Division I championships

Other national team championships
SMU won the following national championships that are not bestowed by the NCAA:
Men's (3)
Football (1): 1935
Football (1): 1981
Football (1): 1982
Women's (1)
Golf (1): 1979 (AIAW)

Athletic venues
Football: Gerald J. Ford Stadium (32,000)
Basketball / Volleyball: Moody Coliseum (7,000)
Soccer: Westcott Field (4,000)

Athletic directors

 Matty Bell – 1947–1964
 Hayden Fry – 1964–1972
 Dave Smith – 1972–1974
 N.R. "Dick" Davis 1974–1978
 Russ Potts – 1978–1981
 Bob Hitch – 1981 – Dec. 1986
 Dudley Parker – Dec. 1986 – Oct. 1987
 Doug Single – Oct. 1987 – April 1990
 Forrest Gregg – April 1990 – June 1994
 Bill Lively – July 1994 – Dec. 1994
 Jim Copeland – Jan. 1995 – Feb. 2006
 Brian O'Boyle – Feb. – March 2006
 Steve Orsini – June 2006 – May 2012
 Rick Hart – July 2012 – present

Notable athletes

Bryson DeChambeau - U.S. Open Winner; PGA Tour Pro
 Doak Walker — Heisman winner; Pro Football Hall of Fame Inductee
 Kyle Rote - Running back and receiver for eleven years in the National Football League (NFL) for the New York Giants, All-American running back at SMU, and was the first overall selection of the 1951 NFL Draft.
 Raymond Berry - Former professional American football player and coach in the National Football League (NFL), led the NFL in receptions and receiving yards three times and in receiving touchdowns twice, and was invited to six Pro Bowls. As head coach of the New England Patriots, Berry took them to Super Bowl in the 1985 season.
 Eric Dickerson — All-American; Pro Football Hall of Fame Inductee
 Haskell "Hack" Ross — trainer, Thoroughbred racing 
 Forrest Gregg — two-time Super Bowl winner; Pro Football Hall of Fame Inductee; Vince Lombardi called him "the finest player I ever coached."
 Spike Davis — professional rugby player with the Ohio Aviators of PRO Rugby
 Jim Duggan — professional wrestler best known as "Hacksaw" Jim Duggan; WWE Hall of Fame Inductee 2011; inaugural WWE (WWF) Royal Rumble winner (1988)
 Emmanuel Sanders – Super Bowl Winner
 Thomas Morstead – Super Bowl Winner
 Aldrick Robinson – Super Bowl Winner
 Ja'Gared Davis - 106th Grey Cup Winner
 Payne Stewart - Professional Golfer; PGA Championship Winner; two-time U.S. Open Winner
 Ryan Berube - Olympic Gold medal anchoring the U.S. men's team in the 4×200-meter freestyle relay and All-American Swimmer 
 Jerry Heidenreich - Olympic champion, former world record-holder, and All-American Swimmer 
 Lars Frölander - Olympic Gold Medal (Sweden) and All-American Swimmer 
 Steve Lundquist - Olympic gold medalist, former world record-holder, and All-American Swimmer 
 Ricardo Prado - Olympic, All-American and former World Record holding medley Swimmer from Brazil 
 Scott Donie - All-American Diver. He earned the silver medal in the 1992 Summer Olympics on the 10 m platform 
 Martina Moravcová - Two-time Olympic silver medalist from Slovakia and All-American Swimmer 
 Michael Carter - An American former collegiate and professional football player and track and field athlete. He was a three-time Pro Bowl and four-time All-Pro selection, and an Olympic athlete, winning a silver medal in the shot put in the 1984 Summer Olympics.

The SMU football program has also produced other professional football standouts, such as Don Meredith, Kyle Rote, Jerry Ball, Craig James and more recently Cole Beasley, Sterling Moore, Chris Banjo, Kenneth Acker and Taylor Thompson.They are considered the best football team back then when they were ranked number 1 in 1982.

Footnotes

References

External links